Rodion Plaksa (born 22 January 2002) is a Ukrainian professional footballer who plays as a midfielder for Ukrainian Premier League club Chornomorets Odesa.

Career
Plaksa is a product of Shakhtar Donetsk and Azovstal Mariupol youth sportive school systems. He made his debut for Mariupol in the Ukrainian Premier League as a start squad player in the losing away match against Shakhtar Donetsk on 30 October 2020.

References

External links
 
 

2002 births
Living people
People from Vuhledar
Ukrainian footballers
FC Mariupol players
FC Chornomorets Odesa players
Ukrainian Premier League players
Association football midfielders
Sportspeople from Donetsk Oblast